The Citadelle Laferrière or, Citadelle Henri Christophe, or simply the Citadelle, is a large early 19th-century fortress situated on the Bonnet à l'Evêque mountaintop in Nord, Haiti. Commissioned by Haitian revolutionary Henri Christophe, and built by tens of thousands of former slaves, the Citadelle was the linchpin of the newly independent Haiti's defensive strategy against potential French incursion.

Including several smaller forts across the country, the stronghold remains the only African-derived military fortification in the New World as well as the first example of African-derived colonial architecture; which it shares with Sans-Souci Palace, also commissioned by Christophe. Designated by UNESCO as a World Heritage Site in 1982 along with the aforementioned Sans-Souci, the fortress is universally regarded as an icon of the Caribbean nation.

History

Commissioned in 1805 by Henri Christophe and completed in 1820, the fortress was built as part of a system of fortifications designed to thwart potential foreign incursions; notably the French. During the stronghold's conceptual phase, Christophe was a general in the Haitian army and chief administrator of the country's northern regions. The ensuing power struggle he had with his rival and fellow revolutionary Alexandre Pétion, would result in his self-declaration as king of Northern Haiti in 1811.

The Citadelle, constructed by over 20,000 ex-slaves, was built several kilometres inland atop the  Bonnet à l’Eveque mountain, as a means of providing the optimal military vantage point. The location enabled Haitian forces to strategically keep watch over a vast distance, from the nearby valleys to the coastline. Cap-Haïtien and the adjoining Atlantic Ocean are visible from the roof of the fortress. It is the largest fortress in Haiti and one of the largest in the New World; it continues to serve as a symbol of Haitian independence.

The Haitians outfitted the fortress with 365 cannons of varying size, assembled from the abandoned munitions left behind by the European forces that formerly occupied the island. The enormous stockpiles of cannonballs still sit in pyramidal stacks at the base of the fortress walls. Since its construction, the fortress has withstood numerous earthquakes, though a French attack never came and it was eventually abandoned.

In the event of an invasion, Christophe planned to have his military burn the valuable crops and food stocks along the coast, then retreat to the fortress, setting ambushes along the sole mountain path leading to the Citadelle.

Christophe suffered a stroke in 1820, and some of his troops mutinied. Shortly afterwards, he committed suicide—according to legend, by shooting himself with a silver bullet. Loyal followers covered his body in quicklime and entombed it in one of the Citadelle's interior courtyards to prevent others from mutilating the corpse.

Description
The colossal physical dimensions of the fortress have made it a Haitian national symbol, featured on currency, stamps, and tourist ministry posters. Workers laid the large foundation stones of the fortress directly into the stone of the mountaintop, using a mortar mixture that included quicklime, molasses, and the blood of local cows and goats—and cows hooves that they cooked to a glue and added to the mix to give the mortar added strength and bonding power.

Large cisterns and storehouses in the fortress's interior were designed to store enough food and water for 5,000 defenders for up to one year. The fortress included palace quarters for the king and his family, in the event that they needed to take refuge within its walls. Other facilities included dungeons, bathing quarters, and bakery ovens. Also visible is the tomb of Christophe's brother-in-law, killed when the gunpowder room he was in exploded.

The Citadelle's appearance from the trail leading up to its base has been likened to the prow of a great stone ship, jutting out from the mountainside. The structure is angular and assumes different geometric forms based on the viewer's orientation. Some of the angles on the Citadelle were intentionally put there by Christophe to deviate cannonballs if attacked and the Epaulette is a great example of using angles to deviate and deflect shots. Though most of the fortress has no roof as such (the interior top is a latticework of stone walkways), some slanted portions are adorned with bright red tiles. The fortress has been repaired and refurnished several times since its construction, including in the 1980s with help from UNESCO and the World Monuments Fund, though little of it has been replaced and its design remains the same.

Tourism
The Citadelle is one of the most popular tourist destinations in Haiti. Directions to and history of the fortress are provided by self-appointed guides from the town of Milot. Near the entrance to Sans-Souci Palace, which is at the start of the trail to the Citadelle, visitors may be asked to pay a small fee. Visitors are also encouraged to rent a horse for the uphill trek. The first portion of the 11 kilometre (7 mi) trail is navigable by 4WD vehicle, although infrequent landslides and construction projects sometimes make this unreliable. Numerous people live along the trail and sell souvenirs or drinks, such as fresh coconut juice, to travelers. Drinks are a necessity in the tropical heat. The trail is paved stone, generally smooth and in good condition. About three-quarters of the way up from the parking lot, visitors must complete the final portion on horseback or on foot. The entire 11-kilometre (7 mi) trail, starting in Milot, is almost completely uphill, but can be walked by experienced hikers who carry plenty of water. Most of the interior of the Citadelle fortress itself is accessible to visitors, who may also climb the numerous staircases to the fortress's roof, which is free of guardrails. On a clear day, the city of Cap-Haïtien and the Atlantic Ocean can be seen to the north. Because of its elevation the top of the Citadelle is used by United Nations Stabilization Mission in Haiti (MINUSTAH) for a Radio repeater, with an antenna on the highest point.

Though the turbulent political situation in Haiti (principally in the central region) has deterred visitors in recent years, the regions of the north and south of the country remain largely peaceful, making travel to the Citadel less challenging or hazardous than travel within the Haitian capital, Port-au-Prince.

Conservation and safety concerns

After visiting the Citadelle in July 2012, Haitian President Michel Martelly heavily criticized the Haitian National Institute for Historic Preservation (ISPAN) — the organization tasked with preserving Haiti's cultural heritage sites — describing the site as in a state of disrepair and calling ISPAN's efforts "unacceptable". His visit was intended to assess the state of the Citadel for conservation, but he refused to visit its upper levels, deeming them unsafe for visitors.

The Global Heritage Fund, a California-based non-profit organization, has investigated the Citadelle for monument conservation, community development, training and cultural heritage revitalization. The project would focus on both the Citadelle and nearby Sans-Souci Palace, with hopes of preserving the structures as safe tourism sites to promote sustainable local economic growth.

Footnotes

External links

Google Satellite Pictures
Citadelle Laferrière on Global Heritage Network
Global Heritage Fund investigative summary of the Citadel(video)

Forts in Haiti
Military history of Haiti
World Heritage Sites in Haiti
Nord (Haitian department)
Infrastructure completed in 1820
Ruins in Haiti